Runaway Girl is a 1965 American crime drama film directed by Hamil Petroff and starring Lili St. Cyr, Jock Mahoney and Laurie Mitchell.

Plot

Cast
 Lili St. Cyr as Edella 
 Jock Mahoney as Randy Minola 
 Laurie Mitchell as Winnie Bernay 
 Ron Hagerthy as Mario Minola 
 Booth Colman as Angelo Guglietta 
 Laurindo Almeida as The Guitarist 
 Robert Shayne as Walter Quillen 
 June Jocelyn as Louise 
 Ann Graves as Ginger
 Shary Marshall as Betsy 
 Suzi Carnell as Ruth 
 Dusty Enders as Jeanette 
 Sandra Phelps as Cleo
 Lisa Pons as Tina

References

Bibliography
 Gene Freese. Jock Mahoney: The Life and Films of a Hollywood Stuntman. McFarland, 2013.

External links
 

1965 films
1965 crime drama films
American crime drama films
American black-and-white films
Films scored by Richard LaSalle
1960s English-language films
1960s American films